Split Lip is a band responsible for the Midwestern emo-core sound, together with bands like Endpoint, and a group they inspired, The Get Up Kids.  After gaining acclaim in the small international hardcore community for their debut album, the band switched gears to more country-leaning pop rock and changed the name of their band to Chamberlain, re-releasing their second album under the new moniker.

History 
The band started as a youth crew inspired straight edge group in the Indianapolis, Indiana suburb of Carmel around singer Steve Duginske and bass player Curtis Mead, along with Clay Snyder. A mutual friend introduced the trio to young drummer Charlie Walker, and not long afterward, the quartet recorded their first demo and began playing shows. The addition of guitarist Adam Rubenstein from another local band, Decrepit, shifted them musically a bit and then new singer Dave Moore completed the group. The band played regularly with another local act, Hardball, and their Louisville, Kentucky friends Endpoint and started to build a following. Split Lip's second demo, entitled "A New Beginning" - a reference to the  addition of Rubenstein and Moore, was still very youth crew oriented and went as far as to include a song about their local crew - but also dabbled in politics, and began to show the future direction of personal emotion-filled lyrics that the band would come to be known for. This demo attracted the attention of Pennsylvania-based Smorgasbord Records, and the band was invited to contribute a song for the "Voice of the Voiceless" animal-rights compilation, which also included Endpoint, as well as Youth of Today and Majority of One.

With this exposure, the band began playing shows throughout the midwest, including numerous trips to St. Louis and Louisville, as well as the standards of Indianapolis and Bloomington, Indiana. After an initial trip to the Newspace in Dayton, Ohio, the band developed a tight working relationship with the Dayton band Stronghold, and it was the members of Stronghold who convinced Doghouse Records to release Split Lip's music. The band's debut 7" on Doghouse Records firmly established their sound, and with the Doghouse distribution, allowed a much wider audience. In 1992, the band was invited to be a headliner at the first More than Music Festival in Dayton, and instantly developed a national reputation as one of the premier bands of the fledgling emo-core genre.

After recording the landmark "For the Love of the Wounded" in the spring of 1993, the band set out on their first U.S. tour. The release of "For the Love..." was delayed until the fall, but upon its release, the album became an overnight success, helping to define the emerging modern emo-core genre with its passionate sound and poetic, introspective lyrics. 

1994 saw the band re-grouping, and working on material for their next record, and continuing to play shows in the midwest. During the summer of 1994, they again hit the road, this time focusing on the western US with Endpoint and Shift. 

In late 1995, the band again returned to Detroit to record "Fate's Got A Driver." It was this record that set the gold-standard for emo-core. The intricate guitar work and soulful emotive lyrics laid the foundation for bands to come, such as The Get Up Kids. The summer of 1995 saw the band hit the road again, this time with Ohio's Colossus of the Fall, and DC's Samuel. It was during this month-long outing that the decision came to change the name and the direction of the band. Moore and Rubenstein returned to the studio in late 1995 and re-recorded the vocals and re-mixed the album, and Chamberlain was born.

A final Chamberlain studio album, "The Moon My Saddle," was recorded in the summer of 1998 and released later that year by Doghouse. The group continued performing for another two years, but without Snyder (who was not replaced, Mead (replaced by Showermast/Red Devil, Blue Devil's Seth Greathouse) and Walker (replaced by Uvula's Wade Parish).

Matt "The Naked Bear" Reece carried a lot of drums, as well as sang some backing vocals. A shout out to Reece is also audible at the end of their Operation Ivy cover on the Songs You May or May Not Have Heard Before record (he also sings the second verse.)

Reunion 
On the heels of a mini-Chamberlain reunion at the 2008 South by Southwest festival that featured Moore, Rubenstein, Walker and Mead, Split Lip reformed with Snyder in May 2009 for a series of shows culminating in the Burning Fight book release show in Chicago. The show celebrated the release of the '90s hardcore book of the same name released by Revelation Records. Aside from the Chicago date, two other shows were played in Louisville and Indianapolis in May, followed by a December performance at New York's Bowery Ballroom. Prior to these gigs, Snyder hadn't played with the band since 1998.

Split Lip/Chamberlain will be touring with The Gaslight Anthem and Tim Barry starting in mid-July. The band will be selling a 7-inch single on tour, featuring its first new music since splitting in 2000: "Raise It High" on the A-side, with a newly recorded version of the old song "The South Has Spoiled Me" on the B-side. "The South Has Spoiled Me" includes vocals by Gaslight Anthem singer Brian Fallon and piano by Jonathan Cohen, who played on the original version.

Post-Split Lip/Chamberlain Projects 
 Charlie Walker played drums for the band Institute alongside former Bush frontman Gavin Rossdale, as well as New End Original with Jonah Matranga of Far
 Curtis Mead lives in Los Angeles, California and played bass for Little Wolverines and currently Model/Actress.  Model/Actress now includes Chuck Walker on drums for their support slot with Mudhoney in LA on 14 November 2008.
 Adam Rubenstein released a solo album under the name "Adam Dove".
 David Moore is writing and recording a solo album, in addition to playing in the country-soul band Chevy Downs.
 Adam Rubenstein and David Moore contributed a track to Doghouse Records' Bob Dylan tribute album.

Discography 

Visual discography of Split Lip / Chamberlain:
http://uniontown.virb.com/

Full Lengths
Check it here: Visual discography of Split Lip / Chamberlain:
http://uniontown.virb.com/
 For the Love of the Wounded 1993, Doghouse Records
 Fate's Got a Driver 1995, Doghouse Records
 Songs You May or May Not Have Heard Before: Archived Music for Stubborn People 1995, Doghouse Records

Demos and EPs
 Demo 1990
 A New Beginning 1991
 Soul Kill 1992, Doghouse Records
 Union town 1994, Anti-Matter Fanzine

Compilation Appearances
 "Evolution" 1991, appeared on "Voice of the Voiceless", Smorgasbord Records

External links
 

American emo musical groups
Straight edge groups
Musical groups established in 1996
Musical groups disestablished in 2000
Doghouse Records artists